Kolkata Metro Rail Corporation (KMRC) is a Government of India enterprise formed in 2008. The agency was formed to oversee the implementing Kolkata Metro Line 2, also known as East West Metro, connecting the twin cities Kolkata and Howrah. The under construction metro rail route will be partly underground including the part that will be under the river Ganges. The 16.6 km route will have six station each in underground and elevated portions. The terminal stations will be Salt Lake Sector V and the Howrah Maidan. The elevated stretch started operations on 13 February 2020.

Ownership

History 
KMRC was formed as a joint venture company between two govt bodies, i.e. Government of West Bengal and Government of India on a 50-50 partnership basis. Ministry of Urban Development (now renamed as Ministry of Housing and Urban Affairs) holds the shares on behalf of Govt. of India.

On 29 September 2010, it was decided that Govt. of West Bengal will withdraw all its shares from KMRC, and Govt. of India will be the shareholder of KMRC along with JICA. Thus Govt. of West Bengal gave all its shares to the Ministry of Railways, and making Kolkata Metro a central government entity again.

Current status 
The current shareholders are given below-

 Ministry of Railways 74% (including the shares of Govt. of West Bengal) 
 Ministry of Housing and Urban Affairs 26%

As of 31 March 2017, equity holding details-

 Ministry of Railways–   (68.03%) 
 Ministry of Housing and Urban Affairs–   (31.97%)

Hurdles faced 
The main problem that were faced by KMRC was regarding land. Most of the places, non-availability of land led to delay in the project multiple times. Some of them are mentioned below-

 Land issue for construction of a new Central station for Line 2, thus leading to route realignment.
 Land issue in Duttabad for erection of piers of elevated stretch, and leading to resurveying of the stretch by RITES
 Land and rehabilitation issues in construction of Mahakaran station and so shifting the station location.

Other issues were-

 Delay in finalisation of the newly aligned route from Sealdah to Howrah.
 Improper and irregular flow of funds 
 Traffic diversion related problems also led to delays

See also 
 Kolkata Metro Line 1
 Kolkata Metro Line 2
 Kolkata Metro Line 3
 Kolkata Metro Line 6

References

External links 
 
Meet on E-W Metro safety (Times of India)

Transport in Kolkata
Rapid transit companies of India
Proposed rapid transit in India
Kolkata Metro